Muhammad Bugaya Dan Tsamiya, known as Bugaya, was a King of Kano who reigned from 1385 - 1390.

Early life 
Muhammad was the son of Tsamiya and Maganarku. After the betrayal and subsequent murder of his father by his uncle Usman Zamnagawa, his uncle tried to bed Maganarku but she told him she was pregnant. Zamnagawa then gave her herbs to abort the baby without her consent. She however still gave birth to a healthy child. This was how he earned the epithet "Bugaya". This would put his year of birth between 1343 and 1344.

Life as Sultan 
Bugaya came to power in 1385 after the death of his brother, Yaji I. Bugaya was said to have sent the Maguzawa from Fongui Rock and compelled them to disperse across the sultanate. Bugaya's reign was filled with peace and tranquility, most likely profiting from the reputation of his late older brother. Jizya was paid regularly throughout the sultanate and he enjoyed no rebellion. This allowed him to retire to a peaceful life after transferring all his royal duties to his Galadima (Administrator).

Death 
Bugaya died in 1390 after ruling for five years. His body then washed and prepared in accordance with Islamic rites by Lawal, Jigawa, Turbana and Kusuba on the orders of Liman Madatai who prayed over his body. According to the Kano Chronicle, Bugaya was the first Kano ruler to be buried at Madatai. He was succeeded by his nephew, Kanajeji Dan Yaji.

Biography in the Kano Chronicle
Below is a full biography of Bugaya from Palmer's 1908 English translation of the Kano Chronicle.

References 

1390 deaths
Monarchs of Kano